"Love City Groove" is a song by British rap group Love City Groove, that represented the  at the Eurovision Song Contest 1995.

Critical reception
John Bush from AllMusic deemed "Love City Groove" "an upbeat pop/reggae track". Larry Flick from Billboard described it as a "fun" and "infectious hybrid of reggae, pop, and hip-hop styles". In his weekly UK chart commentary, James Masterton noted that the song, being in "a soul/dance vein", "certainly [is] one of the most credible records to be a British Eurovision entry for years." Tim Jeffery from Music Week'''s RM'' Dance Update wrote, "A very pleasant mid-tempo groove with great vocals and a bit of rapping that swings along beautifully in quite old-fashioned jazz funk way and it really gets on your brain. Only trouble is it's a real summer tune — released at the right time this could be another Zhane."

Eurovision Song Contest 1995
On the night of the contest the song was performed 15th in the running order, following 's Frédéric Etherlinck with "La voix est libre" and preceding 's Tó Cruz with "Baunilha e chocolate". It received 76 points, placing 10th in a field of 23.

It was succeeded as UK representative at the 1996 contest by Gina G with "Ooh Aah... Just a Little Bit".

Charts

References

1995 songs
1995 singles
Eurovision songs of 1995
Eurovision songs of the United Kingdom